Jillian Vanstone is a Canadian ballet dancer. She joined the National Ballet of Canada in 1999, was promoted to principal dancer in 2011, and retired from performing in 2022.

Early life
Vanstone was born and raised in Nanaimo, British Columbia. She started ballet at age six. At age 13, she moved to Toronto to train at Canada's National Ballet School.

Career
Vanstone joined the National Ballet of Canada in 1999. In 2011, she was chosen by choreographer Christopher Wheeldon to dance the role Alice in the North American premiere of Alice's Adventures in Wonderland. She won the Rolex Dancers First Award for that role. Later that year, she was promoted to principal dancer. She had portrayed Perdita in the North American premiere of The Winter's Tale and Stella in the Canadian premiere of A Streetcar Names Desire, and danced lead roles in productions such as La fille mal gardée, The Sleeping Beauty, Manon, Apollo, and works by Wheeldon, Guillaume Côté, Alexei Ratmansky, John Neumeier and Jerome Robbins. In 2019, she celebrated her 20th anniversary with the company after a performance of Giselle.

Vanstone retired from performing in 2022. Her final performances was in Wheeldon's After the Rain, which the company acquired especially for this occasion.

Selected repertoire
Vanstone's repertoire with the National Ballet of Canada includes:

Awards
2011: Rolex Dancers First Award

References

Living people
Canadian ballerinas
National Ballet of Canada principal dancers
People from Nanaimo
Canadian female dancers
21st-century ballet dancers
Year of birth missing (living people)